The Satellite Award for Best Cast (or Best Ensemble) in a Motion Picture is one of the Satellite Awards given by the International Press Academy since 2004. It superseded the late 1990s award title Outstanding Motion Picture Ensemble.

Recipients

1990s
Outstanding Motion Picture Ensemble

2000s 
Outstanding Motion Picture Ensemble

Best Cast (or Ensemble)

2010s

2020s

References

External links	
 Official website

Cast Motion Picture
Film awards for Best Cast